The New Zealand women's national field hockey team is also known as the Black Sticks Women. The team's best performances include a gold medal at the 2018 Commonwealth Games, silver medal at the 2010 Commonwealth Games, a third placing at the 2011 Champions Trophy, and fourth placings at the 1986 World Cup, 2012 Summer Olympics and 2016 Summer Olympics. As of December 2017, the team ranks fourth on the International Hockey Federation (FIH) world rankings.

Tournament records

Team

Current squad
The following players were named in the squad for the FIH Pro League matches in Wellington.

All caps and goals current as of 26 February 2023, after the match against China.

The remainder of the national squad is as follows:

Records

Notable players
Olivia merry
Katie Glynn
Christine Arthur
Helen Clarke
Suzie Muirhead
Mary Clinton
Anna Lawrence
Mandy Smith
Charlotte Harrison
Chilly Saminterana

Results

Past results

New Zealand women's national field hockey team results (2011–15)
New Zealand women's national field hockey team results (2016–20)

XXXII Olympic Games

Goalscorers

See also
New Zealand men's national field hockey team
New Zealand women's national under-21 field hockey team

References

External links
Official website
FIH profile

  
Oceanian women's national field hockey teams